Iran national football team may refer to:

Iran national football team, men's national association football team
Iran women's national football team, women's national association football team

See also
:Category:National sports teams of Iran